Mohamed Osman Baloola ( born April 14, 1981) is a Sudanese scientist and inventor who was named among The World's 500 Most influential Arabs in 2012 and 2013 for his work on diabetes. Baloola has been a teaching assistant of biomedical engineering at the Ajman University of Science and Technology since 2010. He won a science and innovation award at the Arabian Business Awards 2011, in the Amrani hotel at Burj Khalifa in Dubai. He won Dh40,000 (11,000 US) during a Sharjah television competition for his invention of a remote monitoring and control system for diabetes patients via mobile phone.

Early life and education
Baloola was born on April 14, 1981, in Abu Dhabi, United Arab Emirates.

Baloola received a Bachelor of Science in biomedical engineering from Ajman University of Science and Technology in September 2009. Then he joined Ajman University as a teaching assistant in the Faculty of Engineering. He won many awards during his studies and after graduating.

Research and publications
Mobile Phone Based Remote Monitoring and Control system For Individualized Healthcare. First AMA-IEEE Medical Technology on Individualized Healthcare, Washington DC, US.2010
Connected Healthcare Solution Using Cell phone. ASME's 5th Frontiers in Biomedical Devices Conference & Exhibition, California, US.2010
Automated Wireless System for Individuals Requiring Continuous Remote Care 6th World Congress on Biomechanics, in conjunction with 14th International Conference on Biomedical Engineering (ICBME), Singapore .2010
Ankabut Users Meeting January 2012.

Diabetes 
Mohamed researches diabetes due to a family history of suffering from the disease. His father, mother and brother are diabetics and his concern for the growing number of diabetics worldwide prompted his invention. He developed a remote monitoring and control system for diabetes symptoms.  He set about creating an artificial pancreas and a remote system to monitor the stability of glucose levels in diabetics.  The device, which can be linked to a hospital database system as well as family and friends, enables an immediate response if a medical situation arises.

Prizes and awards 
The World's 500 Most influential Arabs in 2013 in the “scientist inventor” category for his outstanding contributions in the areas of innovation, research and community service.
The World's 500 Most influential Arabs in 2012.
Arabian Business Achievement Awards 2011 – Science and Innovation Award  2011
First prize in Tomohat Shabab TV program(Young Innovation Award), Sharjah TV 2011
First place in the “Voting for the Best Project” category, 4th UAE Software Development Trade Show, Wollongong University, Dubai 2010
Third place in the “Business Judging” category, 4th UAE Software Development Trade Show, Wollongong University, Dubai 2010
Best Research Paper in Faculty of Engineering, The Fifth Approach Student Scientific Conference 2009
Best Project on Biomedical Day 2008.

Honors
Honor by the Sudanese Ambassador / Ahmed alsadeeq Abdulhai – Sudan Ambassador in UAE – On celebrations of Sudan's 56th Independence Day.2012
Honor from Sudanese Consulate in Dubai and Sudanese Club On celebrations of Sudan's 56th Independence Day- Sudanese Club in Dubai.2012
Honor from the higher Council for the Sudanese community in the UAE – On celebrations of Sudan's 56th Independence Day.2012
Honor from Al-Merrikh sport club On celebrations of Sudan's 56th Independence Day- Sudanese Club in Dubai.2012
Award by Vice President of Ajman University for Commendable achievement for the year.2011

References

External links

Articles on media
Mohammad Baloola interview: Beating the bulge – Arabian Business Magazine
Diabetes invention inches closer to development – Gulf New Newspaper
Graduate invents winning diabetes device – Gulf New Newspaper
Former AUST pupil in Arab elite-Gulf Today Newspaper

ِArabic article on media
Alittihad Newspaper
Alkhaleej Newspaper
Akhir lahza Newspaper
Alintibaha Newspaper

Television interview
Report and Interview with Eng. Mohamed Osman Baloola in MBC in Week, MBC TV .(08:05 - 18:10) 
Report about Eng. Mohamed Osman Baloola in Alyoum  , AlHurra TV (21:10-24:20)

1981 births
Sudanese scientists
Physical chemists
Wolf Prize in Chemistry laureates
California Institute of Technology faculty
Ajman University alumni
Living people
Sudanese expatriates in the United Arab Emirates
Academic staff of Ajman University